The Bridgeman Art Library, based in London, Paris, New York and Berlin, provides one of the largest archives for reproductions of works of art in the world.  Founded in 1972 by Harriet Bridgeman, the Bridgeman Art Library cooperates with many art galleries and museums to gather images and footage for licensing.

The library today 
The Bridgeman Art Library is a company that represents museums, art collections and artists throughout the world by providing a central source of fine art and photography for image users.

The company's aim is to make these images accessible for users on a commercial basis; each one has been catalogued with full picture data and key-worded to simplify the search process. A full research service is also provided whereby expert researchers can select images to the customer's requirements. In addition to fine art, designs, antiques, maps, architecture, furniture, art glass, ceramics, anthropological artefacts- and many other media are featured in the collection.

Bridgeman also provides customers with reproduction licensing and offers advice on how to clear artist's copyright, if additional permission is needed. Copyright holders receive remuneration in the form of half the reproduction fee paid by the customer. As well as supplying images to consumers, Bridgeman works with copyright holders to create high quality reproductions of artists' works using the latest imaging technology. These reproductions can be ordered through various Web sites and apps such as Art Authority. Over 500 new images are added to the Bridgeman archive each week. Museums represented in the archive include the British Museum; the British Library; the National Galleries of Scotland, Sweden and South Africa; the Hamburg Kunsthalle; and the Barnes Foundation.

Bridgeman Art Library v. Corel Corp.
The company was involved in the case Bridgeman Art Library v. Corel Corp., in which the United States District Court for the Southern District of New York ruled that exact photographic copies of two-dimensional works in the public domain cannot be copyrighted, even if making the image takes considerable effort, because the resulting works lack originality.

See also 
List of online image archives

References

External links

Publishing companies established in 1972
Museum companies
Companies based in the City of Westminster
Visual arts publishing companies
Photo archives in the United Kingdom
Stock photography